Lawrence Peter Lozinski (born October 16, 1958) is a Canadian former ice hockey goaltender who played 30 games in the National Hockey League with the Detroit Red Wings during the 1980–81 season.

Career statistics

Regular season and playoffs

External links

References

1958 births
Living people
Abbotsford Flyers players
Adirondack Red Wings players
Canadian ice hockey goaltenders
Detroit Red Wings draft picks
Detroit Red Wings players
Flin Flon Bombers players
Ice hockey people from Saskatchewan
Kalamazoo Wings (1974–2000) players
Kansas City Red Wings players
New Westminster Bruins players